In Mathematics, the Lindström–Gessel–Viennot lemma provides a way to count the number of tuples of non-intersecting lattice paths, or, more generally, paths on a directed graph. It was proved by Gessel–Viennot in 1985, based on previous work of Lindström published in 1973.

Statement 

Let G be a locally finite directed acyclic graph. This means that each vertex has finite degree, and that G contains no directed cycles. Consider base vertices  and destination vertices , and also assign a weight  to each directed edge e. These edge weights are assumed to belong to some commutative ring. For each directed path P between two vertices, let  be the product of the weights of the edges of the path. For any two vertices a and b, write e(a,b) for the sum  over all paths from a to b. This is well-defined if between any two points there are only finitely many paths; but even in the general case, this can be well-defined under some circumstances (such as all edge weights being pairwise distinct formal indeterminates, and  being regarded as a formal power series). If one assigns the weight 1 to each edge, then e(a,b) counts the number of paths from a to b.

With this setup, write
.

An n-tuple of non-intersecting paths from A to B means an n-tuple (P1, ..., Pn) of paths in G with the following properties:

 Whenever , the paths Pi and Pj have no two vertices in common (not even endpoints).

The Lindström–Gessel–Viennot lemma then states that the determinant of M is the signed sum over all n-tuples P = (P1, ..., Pn) of non-intersecting paths from A to B:

In particular, if the only permutation possible is the identity (i.e., every n-tuple of non-intersecting paths from A to B takes ai to bi for each i) and we take the weights to be 1, then det(M) is exactly the number of non-intersecting n-tuples of paths starting at A and ending at B.

Proof 

To prove the Lindström–Gessel–Viennot lemma, we first introduce some notation.

This n-path will be called non-intersecting just in case the paths Pi and Pj have no two vertices in common (including endpoints) whenever . Otherwise, it will be called entangled.

Given an n-path , the weight  of this n-path is defined as the product .

This, of course, generalises the notation  introduced before.

Recalling the definition of M, we can expand det M as a signed sum of permutations; thus we obtain

Let  denote the set of entangled twisted n-paths. Given such an involution, the rest-term

in the above sum reduces to 0, since its addends cancel each other out (namely, the addend corresponding to each  cancels the addend corresponding to ).

Construction of the involution: The idea behind the definition of the involution  is to take choose two intersecting paths within an entangled path, and switch their tails after their point of intersection. There are in general several pairs of intersecting paths, which can also intersect several times; hence, a careful choice needs to be made. Let  be any entangled twisted n-path. Then  is defined as follows. We call a vertex crowded if it belongs to at least two of the paths . The fact that the graph is acyclic implies that this is equivalent to "appearing at least twice in all the paths". Since P is entangled, there is at least one crowded vertex. We pick the smallest  such that  contains a crowded vertex. The crowdedness of v implies j > i.

It is immediately clear that  is an entangled twisted n-path. Hence . Thus  is an involution. It remains to demonstrate the desired antisymmetry properties:

To show that  we first compute, appealing to the tail-swap

Hence .

Thus we have found an involution with the desired properties and completed the proof of the Lindström-Gessel-Viennot lemma.

Remark. Arguments similar to the one above appear in several sources, with variations regarding the choice of which tails to switch. A version with j smallest (unequal to i) rather than largest appears in the Gessel-Viennot 1989 reference (proof of Theorem 1).

Applications

Schur polynomials 

The Lindström–Gessel–Viennot lemma can be used to prove the equivalence of the following two different definitions of Schur polynomials. Given a partition  of n, the Schur polynomial  can be defined as:

where the sum is over all semistandard Young tableaux T of shape λ, and the weight of a tableau T is defined as the monomial obtained by taking the product of the xi indexed by the entries i of T. For instance, the weight of the tableau

where hi are the complete homogeneous symmetric polynomials (with hi understood to be 0 if i is negative). For instance, for the partition (3,2,2,1), the corresponding determinant is

To prove the equivalence, given any partition λ as above, one considers the r starting points  and the r ending points , as points in the lattice , which acquires the structure of a directed graph by asserting that the only allowed directions are going one to the right or one up; the weight associated to any horizontal edge at height i is xi, and the weight associated to a vertical edge is 1. With this definition, r-tuples of paths from A to B are exactly semistandard Young tableaux of shape λ, and the weight of such an r-tuple is the corresponding summand in the first definition of the Schur polynomials. For instance, with the tableau
,
one gets the corresponding 4-tuple

On the other hand, the matrix M is exactly the matrix written above for D. This shows the required equivalence. (See also §4.5 in Sagan's book, or the First Proof of Theorem 7.16.1 in Stanley's EC2, or §3.3 in Fulmek's arXiv preprint, or §9.13 in Martin's lecture notes, for slight variations on this argument.)

The Cauchy–Binet formula 

One can also use the Lindström–Gessel–Viennot lemma to prove the Cauchy–Binet formula, and in particular the multiplicativity of the determinant.

Generalizations

Talaska's formula 

The acyclicity of G is an essential assumption in the Lindström–Gessel–Viennot lemma; it guarantees (in reasonable situations) that the sums  are well-defined, and it advects into the proof (if G is not acyclic, then f might transform a self-intersection of a path into an intersection of two distinct paths, which breaks the argument that f is an involution). Nevertheless, Kelli Talaska's 2012 paper establishes a formula generalizing the lemma to arbitrary digraphs. The sums  are replaced by formal power series, and the sum over nonintersecting path tuples now becomes a sum over collections of nonintersecting and non-self-intersecting paths and cycles, divided by a sum over collections of nonintersecting cycles. The reader is referred to Talaska's paper for details.

See also 
Matrix tree theorem

References

 
 
 
 
 
 

Lemmas
Combinatorics
Theorems in combinatorics